Izh may refer to;

 IZh, a Russian automobile marque of the Izhevsk Machinebuilding Plant
 Izh (river), Udmurt Republic, Russia
 Ingrian language, a Finnic language spoken by the Izhorians of Ingria